USS Albany (SSN-753) is a , the fifth ship of the United States Navy to be named for Albany, New York. The contract to build her was awarded to Newport News Shipbuilding and Dry Dock Company in Newport News, Virginia, on 29 November 1983 and her keel was laid down on 22 April 1985.  She was launched on 13 June 1987 sponsored by Nancy M. Kissinger, wife of Henry Kissinger, and was commissioned on 7 April 1990 with Commander Darl R. Anderson in command.

Albany was the last US submarine built via the traditional "keel up" ship construction method.  Thus, it was the last submarine to "launch" down the shipway.

This was done to test construction methods using this steel, which would later be employed in the assembly of the new s. 

On 30 July 2004 Albany returned to Norfolk, Virginia, after a six-month deployment that began in the Persian Gulf and Gulf of Oman, then proceeded to the Mediterranean Sea for a NATO exercise, Operation "MEDSHARK/Majestic Eagle."

On 14 May 2022 Albany returned to Norfolk after a six-month deployment.

References 

 
 

Los Angeles-class submarines
Cold War submarines of the United States
Nuclear submarines of the United States Navy
1987 ships
Submarines of the United States
Ships built in Newport News, Virginia